Malik Balka Khalji was the governor of Bengal during 1230–1231 under Delhi Sultan Shamsuddin Iltutmish.

History
Balka was the son of Iwaz Khalji. After the death of Alauddin Daulat Shah Khalji, Balka captured the throne of Bengal. Malik Balka styled himself as the independent ruler of Bengal. Angered by this, Sultan Shamsuddin Iltutmish once again invaded Bengal in 1231 and marched against Balka and his army. Balka was later defeated, captured and killed. Thus the rule of Khalji dynasty of Bengal came to an end.

See also
 List of rulers of Bengal

References

Governors of Bengal
13th-century Indian Muslims
13th-century Indian monarchs